Brandenburg-Görden Prison is located on Anton-Saefkow-Allee in the Görden quarter of Brandenburg an der Havel. Erected between 1927 and 1935, it was built to be the most secure and modern prison in Europe. Both criminal and political prisoners were sent there, as well as people imprisoned for preventive detention or for interrogation and prisoners of war. Built with a capacity of 1,800, it sometimes held over 4,000 during the Nazi era. After the war, East Germany used the prison to incarcerate at least 170,000 people. Prisoners were used for labor, with them making things such as tractors, kitchen furniture, uniforms and radiation suits, electric motors, shoes, and cars.

History 
A first Zuchthaus in Brandenburg was established on Neuendorfer Straße in 1820. The old Brandenburg Prison was closed in 1931 because of its disastrous hygienic conditions, but later housed a Nazi concentration camp from August 1933 till February 1934. It later became the site of the Brandenburg Euthanasia Centre, part of the Nazis' involuntary euthanasia program known later as Aktion T4, where from February to October 1940, some 10,000 disabled, mentally retarded or mentally ill people were gassed based on official numbers.

Upon the Nazi Machtergreifung, the new prison in Görden became an instrument of political repression and terror. It was a Zuchthaus for inmates with lengthy or life sentences at hard labor, as well as prisoners who had been sentenced to death. Initially, there weren't many political prisoners at the new prison, but during the war years, the share increased to about 60%.

In 1940, Brandenburg-Görden became one of the selected central execution sites established throughout Germany by the order of Adolf Hitler and Reich Minister of Justice Franz Gürtner. An execution chamber was installed, using what had previously been a garage, with a guillotine and a gallows. The total number of executions was 2,743 and took place between 1 August 1940 and 20 April 1945, most of them convicts sentenced to death by Sondergerichte courts of the notorious People's Court under President Roland Freisler. The youngest victim was a 15-year-old French boy. By the end of 1942, "preventive detention" prisoners, such as Jews, Roma, Sinti, Russians and Ukrainians were sent to concentration camps.

Several victims were members of the 20 July plot, about 100 were Bible Students condemned as conscientious objectors. By the end of the Nazi era, from 1933–1945, roughly 4,300 people had been imprisoned at Brandenburg-Görden. A total of 1,722 people, who were sentenced for political reasons, were executed there. 652 other political prisoners died from disease and seven committed suicide.

The Red Army liberated the prison during the Battle of Berlin on 27 April 1945, finding around 3,600 prisoners, including 180 awaiting execution. After the war, the Soviet Army imprisoned collaborators here until 1947, primarily members of the Russian Liberation Army. Until 1989, the German Democratic Republic also used the correctional facility for political prisoners. Since 1975, there has been a memorial room at the prison, which is today part of a Justizvollzugsanstalt complex.

The present 

Today the prison is divided into three main sections, plus a social therapy wing and prison hospital. There is a jail for 88 adults, a medium security wing  for 330 adult men and a minimum security wing for 100 adult men. In addition, there is a social therapy wing with 80 men and a prison hospital with 32 beds. There are another 36 beds in the transport wing for prisoners who are being moved from one location to another. The JVA Brandenburg is a men's prison and is supported by a total staff of 439, of whom 145 are women.

Prisoners there have sentences from temporary detention to life, the most severe sentence in Germany. Life sentence does not, however, mean one is to spend the rest of one's life in prison, rather that it is for an undetermined, but long time with a minimum of 15 years. After 15 years, the sentence may be commuted.

The prison underwent renovations that were completed in 2014. Security and technical equipment were upgraded. The prison remained operational during this time.

The street where the prison exists is now named for one of the people executed there, Anton Saefkow.

Notable prisoners 
(Many of the people on this list are notable because they later became important in the German Democratic Republic. For more information on any of the people below, see the list on the German version of this page.)
, 1935?-1945
Bruno Baum, 1937–1945
, 1971–1972
Hermann Brill, 1939–1943
, 1941–1945
Ernst Busch, 1943–1945
Karl Wilhelm Fricke, 1956–1959
Michael Gartenschläger, 1961–1971
Paul Hatschek, 1943?-1944
Robert Havemann, 1943–1945
Walter Hochmuth, 1942?-1945
, 1942–1945
Erich Honecker, 1937–1945
Wilhelm Kling, 1937–1945
, 1938–1945
Fritz Lange, 1943–1945
Alfred Lemmnitz, 1941–1945
, 1936–1940
Hans Litten, 1934
Horst Mahler, 1936-
Friedrich Minoux, 1941-1945
Alfred Neumann, 1942–1945
Ernst Niekisch, 1939–1945
Herbert Sandberg, 1934
, 1942–1945
, 1938-1940
Alexander Schwab, from 1937
Kurt Seibt, 1941–1945
Harry Seidel, 1963–1966
Frank Schmökel,  -1993
, 1966

Executed or died at Brandenburg-Görden Prison 

Bernhard Almstadt, Communist and Resistance fighter, executed on 6 November 1944
Hans Anhalt, Nazi war criminal, died in prison on 13 April 1975
Walter Arndt, zoologist, executed on 26 June 1944
Friedrich Aue, Communist and Resistance fighter, executed on 27 November 1944
Bernhard Bästlein, Communist and co-founder of Saefkow-Jacob-Bästlein Organization, executed on 18 September 1944
Bruno Binnebesel, Catholic Priest and Resistance fighter, executed on 13 November 1944
Max Borrack, Resistance fighter, executed on 19 February 1945
Walter Budeus, Communist and Resistance fighter, executed on 21 August 1944
Jean-Marie Derscheid, zoologist, executed on 13 March 1944
Hermann Danz, Communist and Resistance fighter, executed on 5 February 1945
Leo Drabent, Communist and resistance fighter, executed on 20 November 1944
Friedrich Fromm, Officer of the Reichswehr and the Wehrmacht, executed on 12 March 1945
Paul Gesche, Communist and Resistance fighter, executed on 21 August 1944
Claudius Gosau, Communist and Resistance fighter, executed on 6 March 1944
Alois Grimm, Jesuit priest, educator, theologian, hanged on 11 September 1944
Georg Groscurth, doctor, co-founder of European Union (resistance group), executed on 8 May 1944
Nikolaus Christoph von Halem, jurist, businessman and Resistance fighter, executed on 9 October 1944
Ernst Hampel, Communist and Resistance fighter, executed on 20 April 1945
Paul Hatschek, Czech engineer and member of the European Union, executed on 15 May 1944
Michael Hirschberg, SPD Resistance fighter, died from heart attack from injuries after arrest, 20 March 1937
Martin Rasmussen Hjelmen, Norwegian Communist and Resistance fighter, executed on 30 May 1944
Cäsar Horn, Communist and Resistance fighter, executed on 19 March 1945
Franz Jacob, Communist and co-founder of Saefkow-Jacob-Bästlein Organization and Bästlein-Jacob-Abshagen Group, executed 1944
Franz Jägerstätter, Catholic conscientious objector, executed on 9 August 1943
Erich Knauf, author, executed on 2 May 1944
Wilhelm Knöchel, Communist and Resistance fighter, executed on 24 July 1944
Alfred Kowalke, Communist and Resistance fighter, executed on 6 March 1944
Wolfgang Kusserow, Jehovah's Witness conscientious objector, executed on 28 March 1942
Alois Laub, member of Czechoslovak anti-nazi resistance, executed on 19 February 1945
Arthur Ladwig, Communist and Resistance fighter, executed on 10 July 1944
Georg Lehnig, Communist and Resistance fighter, executed on 28 March 1945
Karl Lühr, mayor of Woltersdorf (Wendland, Lower Saxony), executed on 20 December 1943
Rudolf Mandrella, executed on 3 September 1943
Albert Merz, Christadelphian conscientious objector, executed on 3 April 1941
Franz Mett, Communist and Resistance fighter, executed on 21 August 1944
Max Josef Metzger, Catholic priest, executed on 17 April 1944
Joseph Müller, Catholic priest, executed on 11 September 1944
Kurt Müller, Communist and Resistance fighter, executed on 26 June 1944
Theodor Neubauer, Communist and Resistance fighter, executed on 5 February 1945
Hans Neumann, Communist and Resistance fighter, executed on 20 November 1944
Erwin Nöldner, Communist and Resistance fighter, executed on 6 November 1944
, Norwegian Communist and Resistance fighter, executed on 30 May 1944
Siegfried Rädel, Communist and Resistance fighter, executed on 10 May 1943
Franz Reinisch, Catholic priest, executed on 21 August 1942
Paul Rentsch, dentist, member of the European Union (resistance group), beheaded on 8 May 1944
Fritz Riedel, Resistance fighter, executed on 21 August 1944
Wilhelm Rietze, Communist and Resistance fighter, executed on 28 August 1944
Kurt Ritter, Communist and Resistance fighter, executed on 28 August 1944
Friedrich Rödel, Communist and Resistance fighter, executed on 5 February 1945
Beppo Römer, Resistance fighter, executed on 25 September 1944
Axel Rudolph, author of adventure and crime stories, guillotined on 30 October 1944
Anton Saefkow, Communist and co-founder of Saefkow-Jacob-Bästlein Organization, executed on 18 September 1944
Willi Sänger, Communist and Resistance fighter, executed on 27 November 1944
Johann Schellheimer, Communist and Resistance fighter, on 5 February 1945
Otto Schmirgal, Communist and Resistance fighter, executed on 15 December 1944
Martin Schwantes, Communist and Resistance fighter, executed on 5 February 1945
Bernhard Schwentner, Catholic priest, executed on 30 October 1944
Werner Seelenbinder, athlete and Communist, executed on 24 October 1944
Fritz Siedentopf, Communist and Resistance fighter, executed on 28 August 1944
Max Sievers, Freethinker, executed on 17 January 1944
Arthur Sodtke, worker, athlete and Communist, executed on 14 August 1944
Robert Uhrig, Communist and Resistance fighter, died on 21 August 1944
Franz Virnich, jurist and Catholic Verbindungsstudent (CV), died on 5 April 1943
Ernst Volkmann, Catholic conscientious objector, executed on 9 August 1941
Alfons Maria Wachsmann, Catholic theologian, executed on 21 February 1944
Arthur Weisbrodt, Communist and Resistance fighter, executed on 6 November 1944
Martin Weise, Communist and Resistance fighter, executed on 15 November 1943
Hans Wölfel, jurist and Catholic Resistance fighter, executed on 3 July 1944
Johannes Wüsten, author and Communist, died on 26 April 1943
Konstantin Zadkevic, Resistance fighter and Dr in chemistry, leaked information related to the Nazis Nuclear  program, executed on  30 October 1944
Walter Zimmermann, resistance fighter (Saefkow-Jacob-Bästlein Organization), executed on 8 January 1945
Johannes Zoschke, metal worker, sailor, sports enthusiast and anti-fascist Resistance fighter, executed on 26 October 1944

See also 
 Brandenburg Euthanasia Center
 Capital punishment
 Killing centers
 Nazi elimination of political opponents
 Penal labor

References

External links 

 Brandenburg Prison Museum and Documentation Centre Blog post, with photos of prison. Retrieved March 24, 2010
 "Zuchthaus Brandenburg - Görden in Brandenburg an der Havel" Landtag Brandenburg. Official website of the German State of Brandenburg. Retrieved March 17, 2010 

Buildings and structures in Brandenburg an der Havel
Political repression in Nazi Germany
Nazi concentration camps in Germany
Prisons in Germany